The Tang campaign against Kucha was a military campaign led by the Tang dynasty general Ashina She'er against the Tarim Basin oasis state of Kucha in Xinjiang, which was aligned with the Western Turkic Khaganate. The campaign began in 648 and ended on 19 January 649, after the surrender of the Kuchan forces following a forty-day siege in Aksu. Kuchean soldiers tried to recapture the kingdom with the assistance of the Western Turkic Khaganate, but were defeated by the Tang army.

Background

Kucha, a kingdom in the Tarim Basin, was a vassal of the Western Turkic Khaganate. Under the reign of Emperor Gaozu, the king Suvarnapushpa (Chinese: 苏伐勃𫘝 Sufaboshi) provided the Tang court with tribute in 618. In 630, Suvarnapushpa's successor Suvarnadeva (Chinese: Sufadie) submitted to the Tang as a vassal. A Buddhist of the Hinayana sect, Suvarnadeva had hosted the Buddhist monk Xuanzang when he arrived in Kucha during the same year.

Kucha supported Karasahr when the oasis state made a marriage alliance with the Western Turks and ended its tributary relationship with the Tang court in 644. The king of Kucha, Suvarnadeva, renounced Tang suzerainty and allied with the Western Turks. Emperor Taizong responded by dispatching a military campaign led by the general Guo Xiaoke against Karasahr.

Karasahr was besieged in 644 by Guo. Tang forces defeated the kingdom, captured the king, and a pro-Tang member of the royal family was enthroned as ruler. The new king was deposed by the Western Turks soon afterwards, and the Western Turks regained suzerainty over Karasahr. Suvarnadeva died between 646 and 648, and his brother Haripushpa (Chinese: Helibushibi) inherited the throne as Kucha's king. Although Haripushpa sent two tribute embassies to the Tang court, Tang Taizong had already decided to punish Kucha's pro-Turk stance by launching an expedition against the kingdom.

In 646 Irbis Seguy of the Western Turks sought a Chinese princess for his bride. In return, Taizong asked for several Tarim Basin cities. Ibris' refusal was one of the pretexts for the war.

Most of the Tang expeditionary army was made up of 100,000 cavalry supplied by the Tang empire's Tiele allies. The commander-in-chief of the Tang expeditionary army, Ashina She'er, was a member of the Eastern Turkic Khaganate ruling family. He joined the Tang forces after his surrender in 635, and served as a general leading a campaign against Karakhoja. His familiarity with the region as a former Turkic ruler contributed to his success commanding the campaigns against Kucha and Karasahr. Prior to his recruitment as a Tang general, he reigned for five years between 630 and 635, governing the city  of Beshbalik in the Dzungarian Basin. Ashina She'er's deputy commanders were Qibi Heli (a Tiele chieftain who had also become a Tang general) and Guo Xiaoke.

Campaign

Ashina She'er's soldiers were organized in five columns. The Tang army bypassed Karasahr and struck at Kucha from the north by moving through the Dzungarian Basin, which was the territory of the Chuyue (possibly Chigil) and Chumi, two Turkic tribes allied with the oasis state. The Tang army defeated the Chuyue and Chumi before entering the Tarim Basin, upon which the king of Karasahr fled his capital city and tried to find a defensible position in Kucha's eastern territories. Ashina She'er's forces pursued the Karasahr king, took him captive, and then executed him.

The forces defending Kucha, consisting of 50,000 soldiers, were lured and ambushed by Ashina. They chased after a group of 1,000 horsemen employed by Ashina as a decoy, but encountered additional Tang forces that mounted a surprise attack. The Kuchean forces were defeated and retreated to Aksu, a nearby kingdom in the Tarim Basin. Ashina captured the king following a forty-day siege, ending with the surrender of the Kucha forces on 19 January 649. One of Ashina's officers, acting as a diplomat, persuaded the chieftains of the region to surrender instead of fighting back.

Guo Xiaoke, who had led the first Tang campaign against Karasahr in 644, was installed in Kucha as protector-general of the Anxi Protectorate, or the Protectorate of the Pacified West. The headquarters of the protector-general was thus moved from its original location in Gaochang to Kucha. While Ashina was in pursuit of the Kuchean king, Nali, a Kuchean lord, traveled to request the help of the Western Turks. Guo was assassinated after the Kuchean soldiers retook the kingdom with the military assistance of the Western Turks. Ashina returned to Kucha, captured five of the kingdom's cities, and forced the remaining cities to surrender. Tang control was re-established in the oasis state. The brother of the former king, a yabgu or viceroy, was enthroned by the Chinese as a subject of the Tang empire.

The king of Kucha, Haripushpa, was taken to the Tang capital as a prisoner. Execution was the punishment of rebellion in accordance with Tang law. The king was pardoned by Taizong and released after a ritual venerating the emperor's ancestors. He was also named Great Army Commander for the Militant Guards of the Left, a title he received from the emperor.

Aftermath
In retribution for the death of Guo Xiaoke, Ashina She'er ordered the execution of eleven thousand Kuchean inhabitants by decapitation. It was recorded that "he destroyed five great towns and with them many myriads of men and women... the lands of the west were seized with terror." After Kucha's defeat, Ashina dispatched a small force of light cavalry led by the lieutenant Xue Wanbei to Khotan, ruled by the king Yuchi Fushexin. The threat of an invasion persuaded the king to visit the Tang court in person.

The Tang expeditionary army replaced Haripushpa with his younger brother (the "yabgu"), erected an inscribed stele to
commemorate its victory, and returned to Chang’an with Haripushpa, Nali, and Kucha's top general as captives. All three men were given sinecures and kept at the imperial court until 650, when they were sent back to Kucha after it became clear that the vacuum of power created by their absence had reduced the kingdom to a state of civil war and anarchy. The Kucha expedition also killed the pro-Turk king of Karasahr and replaced him with a cousin, but there is no evidence that a Tang military garrison was stationed in Karasahr between 648 and 658. Likewise, the Khotan king's coerced trip to Chang'an does not seem to have resulted in a Tang garrison being sent to Khotan.

It has long been claimed that the conquest of Kucha established Tang rule over the entire Tarim Basin. This is in part due to a number of inaccurate Chinese sources linking the expedition to the establishment of the Four Garrisons of Anxi, which comprised Kucha, Karasahr, Khotan, and Kashgar. However, Zhang Guangda has used excavated texts from Gaochang (Karakhoja or Turfan) to show that the Tang abandoned the attempt to move the headquarters of the Protectorate of the Pacified West to Kucha after Guo Xiaoke's assassination. Instead the headquarters returned to Gaochang until 658, when it was moved back to Kucha following a Tang army's suppression of a local pro-Turk revolt against Haripushpa (who died from an illness during the revolt). The Tang only gained a loose suzerainty over the Tarim Basin states in 649, and did not establish military garrisons in the Tarim Basin. Most of the Tarim Basin states transferred their vassalage to the new Western Turk qaghan, Ashina Helu, in 651, reflecting the fact that they regarded the Western Turks as their traditional overlords. The establishment of the Four Garrisons, and with them a formal Tang military protectorate over the Tarim Basin, should be dated to 658 (after Ashina Helu's defeat) or even to 660, since Kashgar remained allied with the Western Turk leader Duman until Duman's defeat in later 659.

It has also been claimed that the fall of Kucha led to the decline of Indo-European culture in the Tarim Basin and its replacement by first Chinese and then Turkic culture. In fact, the opposite is true. Kuchean culture flourished during the seventh and eighth centuries and Kuchean music was popular in the Tang capital, in part due to the movement of Kuchean musicians to the Tang court. The Turkicization of the Tarim Basin is a later development that came after the end of the Tang dynasty and had no relation to the earlier Tang protectorate in the Tarim Basin.

After 649, the Tang Dynasty continued their war against the Western Turks under the reign of Emperor Gaozong, Taizong's successor. Gaozong conducted a campaign led by general Su Dingfang against the Western Turk qaghan, Ashina Helu in 657. The qaghan surrendered, the Western Turks were defeated, and the khaganate's former territories were annexed by the Tang. The Tang retreated from beyond the Pamir Mountains in modern Tajikistan and Afghanistan after a Turkic revolt in 662, and lost the Tarim Basin to local revolts and Tibetan incursions in 665–670. The Tang regained the Tarim Basin in 692 and again lost it to the Tibetans in the 790s, the Four Garrisons having already been cut off from the rest of the Tang empire by a Tibetan conquest of the Gansu Corridor. Although the Tibetan empire collapsed in the middle of the ninth century, the Tang Dynasty lacked the means to regain dominance in the Tarim Basin and itself ended in 907 with the abdication of Emperor Ai.

See also 
 Turks in the Tang military

References

Citations

Sources 

 
 
 
 
 
 
 
 
 
 

Wars involving the Tang dynasty
Battles involving the Tang dynasty
Chinese Central Asia
Military history of the Göktürks
648
640s conflicts
History of Xinjiang
7th century in China
649
Emperor Taizong of Tang